Macau is a microregion in the Brazilian state of Rio Grande do Norte.

Municipalities 
The microregion consists of the following municipalities:
 Caiçara do Norte
 Galinhos
 Guamaré
 Macau
 São Bento do Norte

References

Microregions of Rio Grande do Norte